The DeepC is  a hydrogen-fueled Autonomous Underwater Vehicle (AUV), power-assisted by an electric motor that gets its electricity from a fuel cell. It debuted in 2004. The project was funded by the German Federal Ministry for Education and Research.

The DeepC is the first AUV to use hydrogen as a fuel.

Specifications
It has two 60 cell PEMFC stacks.

See also

References

External links
DeepC

Hydrogen ships
Robotic submarines
Autonomous underwater vehicles
2004 ships